The Rumi Darwaza (Hindi: रूमी दरवाज़ा, Urdu: ,  and sometimes known as the Turkish Gate), in Lucknow, Uttar Pradesh, India, is an imposing gateway which was built by Nawab Asaf-Ud-Daula in 1784. It is an example of Awadhi architecture.  The Rumi Darwaza, which stands sixty feet tall, was modeled (1784) after the Sublime Porte (Bab-iHümayun) in Istanbul.

It is adjacent to the Asafi Imambara, Teele Wali Masjid in Lucknow and has become a logo for the city of Lucknow. It used to mark the entrance to Old Lucknow City, but as the City of Nawabs grew and expanded, it was later used as an entrance to a palace which was later demolished by the British Raj following the Indian Mutiny.

Etymology
It is believed that the gate was modelled after a historical gate in Constantinople. Rumi refers to Rûm, the historical name used by the Islamic world to denote the region roughly corresponding to Anatolia, or the dominion of the former Eastern Roman Empire. Therefore, "Rumi Darwaza" in Hindustani literally translates to "Turkish Gate" in English.

Place 
This massive gate is situated between Bara Imambara and Chota Imambara. This place is generally very much busy all day, and during weekends most of the tourists visit. The streets are redeveloped as it was earlier constructed of hard brick roadways.The design of the gate represents the most famous industry for which the city Lucknow itself is known for - 'Chikankaari'. When the gate is looked upside down it resembles the v shaped neckline used in chikan clothings. On the top of the gate some small pillars have been erected, they represent the spice- long which was used as one of the ingredients in "paan" of the Mughal kings.The gates were made massive so that when the emperor enters on his horses or elephants, they can easily come through. On further walking towards Bara Imambara, you can see brick roads that are still there and in use since the time they were constructed alongside the construction of its monuments. The Gate also has Matsya fishes engraved on it, that are also there in the state's (Uttar Pradesh's) emblem. The streets represent the very substance, of the city, hence Lucknow is also known as the 'City of Nawabs'. The people there are known for their tehzeeb (respect towards others) and their very fine manners. The Imambara is open to all people and people of all religions. They represent their faith to everyone without harming anyone. When you enter this place it is not about the beliefs, there's a peace of mind and body you can find. The Imambara is indeed a place to be visited and remembered. And the gate to this small paradise is the Roomi darwaza.

Gallery

See also

Awadh
Architecture of Lucknow
List of gates in India
 Bara Imambara
 Chattar Manzil
 Imambara Shah Najaf
 Chota Imambara
 Imambara Ghufran Ma'ab
 Azadari in Lucknow
 Imambaras of Lucknow

References

External links
  Official India Travel & Tours Information Website

Buildings and structures in Lucknow
Indo-Islamic architecture
Tourist attractions in Lucknow
Gates in India
1784 establishments in India